The 1991 Wansdyke Council election was held on Thursday 2 May 1991 to elect councillors to Wansdyke District Council in England. It took place on the same day as other district council elections in the United Kingdom.

These were the final elections of the district council, before its abolition on 1 April 1996 when it was merged with Bath City Council to form Bath and North East Somerset Council.

The 1991 election saw the Conservatives win the largest number of seats but lose their overall majority.

Election results

Ward results
The ward results listed below are based on the changes from the 1987 elections, not taking into account any party defections or by-elections. Sitting councillors are marked with an asterisk (*).

Bathampton

Batheaston

Bathford

Cameley

Camerton

Charlcombe

Chew Magna

Chew Stoke

Clutton

Compton Dando

Farmborough

Freshford

Hartprees

High Littleton

Hinton Charterhouse

Keynsham East

Keynsham North

Keynsham South

Keynsham West

Midsomer Norton North

Midsomer Norton Redfield

Newton St Loe

Paulton

Peasedown St John

Publow

Radstock

Saltford

Stowey Sutton

Timsbury

Westfield

References

1991 English local elections
1991
1990s in Somerset